Nekoda Smythe-Davis (born 22 April 1993) is a British judoka. She competed for England in the women's 57 kg event at the 2014 Commonwealth Games where she won a gold medal.

Judo career
Smythe-Davis became champion of Great Britain on two occasions, winning the lightweight division at the British Judo Championships in 2013 and 2014. In 2014, she was selected to represent England at the 2014 Commonwealth Games in Glasgow. Competing in the women's 57 kg category she won the gold medal after defeating Stephanie Inglis in the final.

In May 2019, Smythe-Davis was selected to compete at the 2019 European Games in Minsk, Belarus.

References

External links
 
 
 

1993 births
Living people
British female judoka
English female judoka
Commonwealth Games gold medallists for England
Judoka at the 2014 Commonwealth Games
Judoka at the 2016 Summer Olympics
Olympic judoka of Great Britain
Commonwealth Games medallists in judo
Sportspeople from London
European Games competitors for Great Britain
Judoka at the 2015 European Games
21st-century British women
Medallists at the 2014 Commonwealth Games